Clermont is a USGS-designated populated place (one of 32) in Bullitt County, Kentucky, United States, south of Louisville. It is an unincorporated community.

Geography 

This is in the Eastern Time Zone (Standard Time: GMT -5 hours, DST: GMT -4 hours), ZIP code 40110.

A large portion of Clermont consists of the Bernheim Arboretum and Research Forest.

Culture 

Clermont is home to the famous Jim Beam distillery, and Bullitt County is a "wet" county.

The Boy Scouts of America Camp Crooked Creek, which is associated with the Lincoln Heritage Council, is also located in Clermont.

History 

The area was officially recognized by the USGS on September 20, 1979, during the rapid expansion of Shepherdsville due to the development of Interstate 65.

References

External links 

 

Unincorporated communities in Bullitt County, Kentucky
Unincorporated communities in Kentucky
Louisville metropolitan area